Lee Soon-Ei (born October 15, 1965) is a South Korean team handball player and Olympic medalist. She played with the South Korean team and received a silver medal at the 1984 Summer Olympics in Los Angeles.

References

External links

1965 births
Living people
South Korean female handball players
Olympic handball players of South Korea
Handball players at the 1984 Summer Olympics
Olympic silver medalists for South Korea
Olympic medalists in handball
Medalists at the 1984 Summer Olympics